Without Face were one of the most famous internationally known Hungarian progressive metal bands. They were formed in the city of Veszprém, Hungary in 1997. The band featured a dual female and male vocal line-up similar to that of gothic metal, with progressive metal and thrash metal overtones and they managed to mix these different styles in a very original own version. Their lyrics are influenced by the writings of H. P. Lovecraft, Edgar Allan Poe, and Henry Wadsworth Longfellow.

In 1998, Without Face recorded its first self-titled demo Without Face. Constant touring and the demo resulted in a deal for their first album Deep Inside with Hammer Music Productions, in 2000. Without Face also appeared on a number of the label's metal music compilations. Their first album was subsequently re-released in the United States by the Dark Symphonies Records label.

The band were approached by English producer Lee Barrett, from Elitist - Earache Records for a four-album deal and worldwide release in 2002. A full-length album, Astronomicon was released in late 2002 and received favourable reviews from the metal music press. It was awarded "Album of the Month" in the English music magazine Metal Hammer. They eventually split up and finished their career in 2008.

Members
 Andras Szabo - male vocals
 Nori Pádár - female vocals
 Zsolt Horváth (Roomy) - guitar
 Szilard Sárik (Sasza) - keyboard
 Gergo Maros - bass guitar
 Peter Sütõ - drums

Without Face have gone through several line-up changes. Péter Márton (bass guitar), Anett Balássi (vocals), Péter "Incho" Inotai (guitars), Kyrah Németh (keyboards), and Bertalan Temesi (bass guitar), were all original members who left in 2000 and 2001. Juliette Kiss, who replaced Anett on vocals, has since left to form UK band To-Mera. Andras Szabo, one of the original vocalists and forming member of the band, departed in 2006, and has since joined ex-Sutcliffe guitarist Tommy's new project Lunatic Asylum, with ex-To-Mera drummer Akos.

Discography
 (Men) Without Face (1998) demo recording
 Deep Inside (2000)
 Astronomicon (2002)

External links
 Without Face official website
 Encyclopaedia Metallum entry
 Without Face biography
 Without Face on Myspace
 Official Without Face Fanpage

Gothic metal musical groups
Hungarian heavy metal musical groups
Progressive metal musical groups
Musical groups established in 1997
Earache Records artists